Fusaric acid is a picolinic acid derivative and an antibiotic (wilting agent) first isolated from the fungus Fusarium heterosporium.

It is typically isolated from various Fusarium species, and has been proposed for a various therapeutic applications. However, it is primarily used as a research tool.

Its mechanism of action is not well understood. It likely inhibits Dopamine beta-hydroxylase (the enzyme that converts dopamine to norepinephrine). It may also have other actions, such as the inhibition of cell proliferation and DNA synthesis. Fusaric acid and analogues also reported as quorum sensing inhibitors.

It is used to make bupicomide.

References

External links

Carboxylic acids
Oxidoreductase inhibitors
Pyridines
Butyl compounds